Michel Lejeune (21 August 1946 – 29 April 2021) was a French politician, a member of the National Assembly.  He represented the Seine-Maritime department,  and was a member of the Union for a Popular Movement.

References

1946 births
2021 deaths
People from Sarthe
Politicians from Pays de la Loire
Mayors of places in Normandy
The Republicans (France) politicians
Union for a Popular Movement politicians
Deputies of the 12th National Assembly of the French Fifth Republic
Deputies of the 13th National Assembly of the French Fifth Republic
French veterinarians